Pseudocolaspis wittei is a species of leaf beetle of the Democratic Republic of the Congo. It was first described by the Belgian entomologist  in 1942, from specimens collected by Gaston-François de Witte from the Albert National Park between 1933 and 1935.

References

Eumolpinae
Beetles of the Democratic Republic of the Congo
Beetles described in 1942
Endemic fauna of the Democratic Republic of the Congo